Scott Christopher Proctor (born January 2, 1977) is an American former professional baseball pitcher. He played in Major League Baseball (MLB) between 2004 and 2011 for the New York Yankees, Los Angeles Dodgers, and Atlanta Braves. In 2012, he played for the Doosan Bears of the KBO League.

Baseball career

Amateur career
Proctor was drafted in the 17th round of the 1995 Major League Baseball draft by the New York Mets out of Martin County High School, but decided to attend Florida State University, where he played for the Florida State Seminoles baseball team under head coach Mike Martin. He was 10–2 in 60 career games for Florida State. In 1996, he played collegiate summer baseball for the Orleans Cardinals of the Cape Cod Baseball League, returned to the league in 1997 and 1998 to play with the Hyannis Mets, and was named a league all-star in 1997.

Minor leagues
In 1998, Proctor was drafted in the fifth round by the Los Angeles Dodgers and assigned to the Yakima Bears to start his professional career. He played for the Vero Beach Dodgers (2000–2001), Jacksonville Suns (2001–2003) and Las Vegas 51s (2003).

New York Yankees
On July 31, 2003, Proctor was traded to the New York Yankees with Bubba Crosby for Robin Ventura. The Yankees assigned him to the Triple-A Columbus Clippers. Proctor made his Major League Baseball debut for the Yankees on April 20, 2004 against the Chicago White Sox, working  innings in relief and allowing 2 earned runs.

Throughout the course of his first season, he appeared in 26 games, pitched 25 innings, finished 12 games, and posted a 2–1 record and a 5.40 ERA with 21 strikeouts. He finished the 2005 season with a 6.04 ERA and a 1–0 record.

In 2006, Proctor emerged as a durable, reliable late-inning option for manager Joe Torre. Finally harnessing his breaking pitches, Proctor led the American League with 83 appearances, often pitching more than one inning or in consecutive games. Proctor notched his first career save in 2006. Along with Kyle Farnsworth and Brian Bruney, Proctor was a part of the Yankees' bridge between the starters and closer Mariano Rivera, and reprised that role for the first part of the 2007 season.

Proctor's heavy use as a Yankee reliever led to concerns that Torre was overusing him. General manager Brian Cashman revealed in 2011 that he confronted Torre about Proctor's workload and asked the pitcher to be more honest about whether he could pitch on a given day: "I met with Proctor and said, 'You better stop telling the manager [that you can pitch] because the way he manages' — I'm not criticizing Joe, that's just the way he is — 'He wants an honest answer. Just tell him no.

Proctor pitched in 5 postseason games for the Yankees: two against Los Angeles and three against Detroit. In six innings, he struck out two and gave up just one run.

Los Angeles Dodgers

On July 31, 2007, Proctor was traded to the Los Angeles Dodgers in exchange for infielder Wilson Betemit. He was mostly used as a late inning setup man. He finished the 2007 season with an impressive 3–0 record and a 3.38 ERA in 31 relief appearances for the Dodgers.

He had a rough 2008 season and spent most of it on the Disabled List. However, he pitched much better in the month of September, helping the Los Angeles Dodgers win the National League West Division title. He finished the season with a 2–0 record, but a high ERA of 6.05 in just 41 games. He became a free agent at the end of the season.

Florida Marlins
In January 2009, he signed a one-year contract with the Florida Marlins worth $750,000, with an additional $250,000 in incentives. During Spring training, he was placed on the disabled list with elbow pain. When the pain remained, and ligament fraying was found, he underwent Tommy John surgery on May 12, 2009, and missed the entire 2009 season. On October 9, 2009, Proctor was released by the Marlins.

Atlanta Braves
On November 4, 2009 Proctor's agent, Mark Rodgers, released that Proctor had signed a split contract with the Braves and received an invitation to Spring training. He spent 2010 pitching for the Double-A Mississippi Braves and Triple-A Gwinnett Braves. As of August 14, he had compiled a 7.82 ERA in 31 appearances between the 2 teams.

On March 27, 2011 after pitching with a 5.06 ERA in ten appearances in the 2011 Atlanta Braves Spring training camp, Proctor was released from the Braves' organization. Had he remained on the Braves' roster the following day, his $750,000 salary would have been paid in full. Instead, the Braves merely had to pay him a fraction of his salary.

Just over a week after being released from the Braves organization, Proctor re-signed to the Braves on April 3, 2011, with a minor league contract. He has been added to the roster of their Triple-A affiliate, the Gwinnett Braves. He had his contract purchased on May 14.

Proctor was released from the Braves on August 10, 2011 after posting a 6.44 ERA in 31 appearances. His roster spot was filled by Arodys Vizcaíno.  In two seasons with Atlanta, Proctor, with a record of 2–3, had a 6.43 ERA in 37 appearances, allowing 35 hits, 5 Home runs, 25 earned runs and 23 walks with 24 strikeouts in 35 innings.

Return to the Yankees
On August 13, he signed a minor league contract with the New York Yankees and was assigned to the Triple-A Scranton/Wilkes-Barre Yankees. He was called up on September 1 and made his debut for the Yankees on September 5, entering in relief against the Baltimore Orioles. Proctor picked up the loss in Game 162, surrendering a walkoff homerun to Evan Longoria that propelled the Rays to the postseason. He declared for free agency on October 11.

Doosan Bears
Proctor signed with the Doosan Bears of the Korea Baseball Organization for the 2012 season.

San Francisco Giants
Proctor signed a minor league contract with the San Francisco Giants on January 2, 2013.

Baltimore Orioles
Proctor was traded to the Orioles on March 29, 2013 for cash considerations.

Pitching
Proctor is a power pitcher with a diverse pitch repertoire. Proctor's fastball ranges from 94 mph to almost 100, although he was known to throw beyond 100 as the closer for the Columbus Clippers, the Yankees' former Triple-A affiliate. As a former minor league starter, Proctor features several pitches. He will throw both four and two-seam fastballs. Proctor's secondary pitches include a mid-eighties slider, a high seventies curveball, and an occasional changeup in the low eighties. He will throw all but his change-up in any count, but his primary weapons are the four-seam fastball, the curve, and the slider.

Controversies
Proctor has run into some instances where he has appeared to assume the responsibility of retaliation for the Yankees. In two instances, Proctor allegedly threw at batters with the intention for retaliation.

One instance occurred in a game against the Seattle Mariners in which Scott Proctor threw behind Yuniesky Betancourt. Betancourt and Proctor exchanged heated words. Proctor may have felt that the Yankees were in position to retaliate after his teammate, Yankees first baseman Josh Phelps, was hit by a pitch. But Phelps was hit in retaliation for his part in, what appeared to be, an intentional hit on Seattle catcher Kenji Johjima. Therefore, the incident between Phelps and Johjima has already been settled with the "beaning" of Phelps but Proctor took offense to the fact the retaliation was exercised on Phelps. Proctor was suspended after that incident.

Another instance occurred on June 1, 2007 when Proctor hit Boston Red Sox first baseman Kevin Youkilis in the shoulder after two Yankee batters were hit. Youkilis was the fifth hit batsman in the game. A visibly enraged Youkilis had to be held back by Yankee catcher Jorge Posada. Proctor was soon ejected after both benches calmed, though Proctor remained upset over his ejection. After the game, he protested to the media that the pitch had gotten away from him and that he had no reason to hit Youkilis as he had a 2–2 count. Before the following game, during the YES Pre-Game Show, Joe Torre told reporters that after Proctor's ejection, Proctor stormed into Torre's office and insisted that he did not throw at Youkilis intentionally, an explanation Torre accepted. Torre, however, did not protest Proctor's resulting one-game suspension.

On June 30, after a poor performance in a loss to the Oakland Athletics (and after taking the loss in each of the Yankees' last two games), Proctor lit fire to his equipment on the field, just feet from the Yankees dugout.

In June 2009, Proctor revealed that he was a recovering alcoholic and had been attending Alcoholics Anonymous meetings. He credits Mariano Rivera with urging him to straighten his life out.

Heavy use
The heavy usage of Scott Proctor early in his career has drawn criticism of the way then Yankee manager Joe Torre used relievers. Proctor appeared in 83 games in both 2006 and 2007, 3rd and 5th most amongst all MLB pitchers respectively. Yankees general manager Brian Cashman says he told Proctor to give an "honest answer" to manager Joe Torre when he asked if Proctor was ready to pitch again.

References

External links

Career statistics and player information from Korea Baseball Organization
By Listening, Proctor Gains a Mental Edge
Yankees' frustrations boil over

1977 births
Living people
New York Yankees players
Los Angeles Dodgers players
Atlanta Braves players
Baseball players from Florida
People from Stuart, Florida
Florida State Seminoles baseball players
Florida State University alumni
Hyannis Harbor Hawks players
Orleans Firebirds players
Major League Baseball pitchers
Yakima Bears players
Vero Beach Dodgers players
Jacksonville Suns players
Las Vegas 51s players
KBO League pitchers
American expatriate baseball players in South Korea
Doosan Bears players
Columbus Clippers players
Inland Empire 66ers of San Bernardino players
Gwinnett Braves players
Myrtle Beach Pelicans players
Scranton/Wilkes-Barre Yankees players
Norfolk Tides players
Martin County High School alumni